Melville may refer to:

Places

Antarctica
Cape Melville (South Shetland Islands)
Melville Peak, King George Island
Melville Glacier, Graham Land
Melville Highlands, Laurie Island
Melville Point, Marie Byrd Land

Australia
Cape Melville, Queensland
City of Melville, Western Australia, the local government authority
Electoral district of Melville, Western Australia
 Melville Bay, Northern Territory
Melville Island, Northern Territory
Melville, Western Australia, a suburb of Perth

Canada
Melville, Saskatchewan, a city
Melville (electoral district), Saskatchewan, a federal electoral district
Melville (provincial electoral district), Saskatchewan
Melville, a community within the town of Caledon, Ontario
Melville Peninsula, Nunavut
Melville Sound, Nunavut
Melville Island (Northwest Territories and Nunavut)
Melville Island (Nova Scotia), in Halifax Harbour
Melville Cove, Halifax, in Halifax Harbour
Melville Island, a small island in the Discovery Islands, British Columbia
 Melville Island, a small island near Dundas Island, British Columbia
Melville Island, on Saint-Maurice River, in Shawinigan, Mauricie, Quebec
Lake Melville, Labrador

Greenland 
Cape Melville (Greenland) (Nallortup Nuua)
Melville Bay, Greenland
Melville Glacier (Greenland)
Melville Land, Greenland
Melville Monument (Greenland) (Usuussarsuaq)

South Africa
Melville, Gauteng, a suburb of Johannesburg
Melville, KwaZulu-Natal, a seaside village on the South Coast of KwaZulu-Natal

United States
Melville, Louisiana, a town
Melville Township, Renville County, Minnesota
Melville, Montana, an unincorporated community
Melville, New York, a hamlet and census-designated place in the town of Huntington
Melville, North Dakota, an unincorporated community
Melville, Oregon, an unincorporated community
Melville, Rhode Island, a village
Melville (Surry, Virginia), a historic house
Melville, West Virginia, an unincorporated community

Elsewhere 
Melville, New Zealand, a suburb of Hamilton
Melville (crater), on the planet Mercury

People
Melville (name), including lists of people with the surname, given name or pen name

Ships
, three ships of the Royal Navy
, two ships named in honor of George W. Melville
, a ship and a shore establishment of the Royal Australian Navy
R/V Melville, an oceanographic research vessel

Titles
Earl of Melville, in the Peerage of Scotland
Viscount Melville, in the Peerage of the United Kingdom

Other uses
Melville (album), 1991 album by the Rheostatics
Melville Corporation, a defunct American retail holding corporation
Melville Shoe Corporation, a defunct American corporation
The Melville, a skyscraper in Vancouver, Canada
Melville Bridge Club, Edinburgh, Scotland
Melville AFC, a former New Zealand football team, now part of Melville United AFC

See also
Melville Castle, a mansion in Midlothian, Scotland
Melville House, Fife, Scotland
Mulville, a surname